Melissa George (born 6 August 1976) is an Australian actress. A former national artistic rollerskating champion and model, George began her acting career playing Angel Parrish in the Australian soap opera Home and Away (1993–1996). After moving to the United States, George made her feature film debut in Dark City (1998). She later had supporting roles in Steven Soderbergh's The Limey (1999), David Lynch's Mulholland Drive (2001), Sugar & Spice (2001), and Down with Love (2003).

George made the transition to leading roles when she appeared as Kathy Lutz in the 2005 remake of The Amityville Horror. She followed this with a succession of films in the thriller and horror genres, such as Derailed (2005), Turistas (2006), WΔZ (2007), 30 Days of Night (2007), Triangle (2009), A Lonely Place to Die (2011), and Felony (2013).

On television, George has had recurring roles on Alias (2003–2004), Grey's Anatomy (2008–2009) and The Good Wife (2013–2014), and a starring role on the NBC medical drama Heartbeat (2016). She received a Golden Globe nomination for her portrayal of Laura Hill on HBO's In Treatment (2008). In 2010, she appeared as Clara Musso on the FOX crime drama series  Lie to Me*. She also starred in the Australian miniseries The Slap (2011), for which she received a Logie Award, and in the BBC spy series Hunted (2012). In 2015, she appeared in the American adaptation of The Slap, playing the same character, Rosie, that she played in the previous version. In 2018 she starred as Diane Hagerty on Hulu's The First. She currently plays Margot on the Apple TV+ drama series The Mosquito Coast (2021).

Early life
George was born on in Perth, Western Australia, to Pamela, a nurse, and Glenn George, a construction worker. She is of Scottish descent. William Ward, a grandfather on her mother's side, worked as a prison warden at Rottnest Island, offshore from Perth. The second of four children, she is also a cousin of the opera singer Taryn Fiebig.

George attended Warwick Senior High School and developed an interest in dancing and began studying jazz, tap, ballet, and modern dance at the age of seven. Her enthusiasm for dance eventually evolved into a passion for artistic roller skating. She is an Australian national roller skating champion and won bronze medals in the National Championships in 1989 and 1990. She won a silver medal at the Junior World Championship in 1991.

Career

1992–1998: Early work
George began modelling in her early teens, and in 1992 she was named Western Australia's Teenage Model of the Year. At the age of 16, George and a friend, Cara Mitchinson, both acted in a mock episode of the popular Australian soap Home and Away with a video camera, playing Bobby and Sophie Simpson, respectively. When the offer of a role on the serial came, George's parents convinced her to relocate from her native Perth to Sydney and she began lodging with families. George met with casting director Liz Mullinar and was subsequently cast in the role of Angel Parrish. She made her first on-screen appearance on 30 March 1993, arriving as a teenage runaway. While playing the role, George made property investments and wrote advice columns for two English teen magazines.</ref>

Her role earned her five consecutive Logie Award nominations, of which she won two. The character became popular among viewers when she was paired up with Shane Parrish, and to this day they remain one of the soap's most loved couples. George departed Home and Away on 30 August 1996. She then made a health and fitness video, Mind, Body and Soul (1996), created a sleepwear line called "An Angel at My Bedside", and had a recurring role on the short-lived 1997 Fox Broadcasting Company television fantasy drama series Roar, which was filmed in Queensland, opposite Heath Ledger. Her fearlessness in performing the show's stunts endeared her to the show's creator, Shaun Cassidy, who subsequently cast her as the female lead in the pilot Hollyweird. A show about "the adventures of an intrepid pair of friends from Ohio who take their love for the macabre and use it to solve crimes plaguing Los Angeles", she was to star alongside Bodhi Elfman and Fab Filippo. The pilot was ordered to series, however, the Fox Network's tinkering and delays frustrated Cassidy, who pulled out of the project, saying that Fox had forced him to spend "much of the last year trying to fix something I never viewed as broken in the first place." Ultimately, production never went ahead on the show. George then appeared on the cover and in a nude pictorial for the March 1997 issue of Australian Playboy.

In late 1997, George decided to relocate from Australia to the United States, hoping to establish a career in Hollywood. She recalled her first day arriving in Los Angeles: "I saw Jennifer Jason Leigh in a parking garage, and [later] the same night, I went to a restaurant and I walked into the toilet and opened the door, and Courtney Love was sitting on the loo." Within a year after relocating, George made her film debut in the critically acclaimed neo-noir science fiction film Dark City (1998).

1999–2008: Film breakthrough

After a supporting role in Steven Soderbergh's 1999 neo-noir crime film The Limey, she was cast in a supporting role, Cleo Miller, in the 2001 black comedy Sugar & Spice and had a minor role in David Lynch's critically acclaimed Mulholland Drive, which opened at the 2001 Cannes Film Festival. She starred in several unaired TV pilots, including the lead role in Lost in Oz, an original sequel to The Wizard of Oz, inspired by the Oz books of L. Frank Baum. After the pilot was filmed, a significant amount of time passed before the decision was made to film a second episode. However, by then George's contract had lapsed, and, as she had just moved to America, she didn't want to move back to Australia to shoot it. Ultimately, a second episode was never shot and the show was never picked up.

She starred in the short-lived ABC drama-comedy Thieves, co-starring John Stamos. She starred in the sixth season premiere of the WB series Charmed, had a minor role opposite Renée Zellweger and Ewan McGregor in the 2003 romantic comedy Down with Love and was originally cast as Susan Freeman in the American series Coupling based on the British series of the same name. After "an audition from hell", George was cast and filmed the pilot, but the network (NBC) then fired the writers and replaced George and her fellow castmembers Breckin Meyer and Emily Rutherfurd with Rena Sofer, Colin Ferguson and Sonya Walger, respectively. The series lasted only four episodes and show creator Steven Moffat blamed NBC's meddling as the reason for the show's failure, saying that they "fucked it up because they intervened endlessly." George later commented that she "dodged a bullet" by being replaced before the show aired.

In 2003, she landed the role of Lauren Reed on the ABC television series Alias. She had auditioned to play lead character Sydney Bristow, but lost out to Jennifer Garner. When that happened, ABC cast her on Thieves instead. It was originally planned that George would guest-star for several episodes but she was quickly upgraded to regular. To explain her character's accent (George is Australian), the writers wrote that she was born in the United States but grew up in London. George left the show at the end of the third season, saying that "I got offered a couple of films so I decided to kind've [sic] move on."

Her first starring role in a feature film was Kathy Lutz in the 2005 remake of the 1979 horror film, The Amityville Horror. The film was not well received by critics, but was a major success at the worldwide box office, grossing over $108 million. Despite unfavorable reviews, Film Threat praised George and her co-star Ryan Reynolds's performances, stating that they "make a striking couple. Both young and extremely attractive" and that she "does an impeccable American accent, but otherwise she is unremarkable as Kathy Lutz. Her physical beauty is sometimes distracting, but not enough to keep the audience awed by her acting." That same year, she played Deanna Schine in the thriller Derailed, co-starring Clive Owen and Jennifer Aniston, playing the wife of a man embroiled in an affair.

In March 2006, it was announced that she had been cast in the NBC comedy-drama series Lipstick Jungle, based on the novel of the same name by Candace Bushnell. George was to play Nico Reilly, the editor-in-chief of Bonfire Magazine. However, the show underwent significant changes with George and other castmates being replaced and with executive producers DeAnn Heline and Eileen Heisler, writers Rand Ravich and Jill Gordon and director Nigel Cole all fired. George had been personally cast by Bushnell, but left in early 2007 when she was offered the HBO series In Treatment. Also in 2006, she travelled to Brazil to film the horror-thriller Turistas (released in the UK and Ireland as Paradise Lost) with Josh Duhamel and Olivia Wilde. Shooting lasted three months on what was the first Hollywood film to be shot entirely on location in Brazil and George, who learned to speak Spanish and Portuguese for the role, said that the experience "made me a better actress, more resilient, tougher."

In 2007, she landed the lead role, Christine, in the biographical drama Music Within, opposite Ron Livingston, which focused on a disability rights activist in Portland, Oregon. The film had a limited release. In an interview, she said that she "knew that Christine's a true character, and the woman responsible for Richard Pimentel's sort of success in a way. She was the driving force behind him and behind every good man is a good woman, and Christine was that woman." She starred in the British horror-thriller WΔZ, and had a prominent role in the film adaptation of 30 Days of Night, directed by David Slade and co-starring Josh Hartnett. The film was a modest success with an over $75 million worldwide gross.

2008–2018: Television and critical acclaim
George returned to television in 2008 in the HBO half-hour drama In Treatment, co-starring Gabriel Byrne and Dianne Wiest, receiving a 2009 Golden Globe Award nomination for Best Supporting Actress – Series, Miniseries, or Television Film, and also received a nomination for "Best Actress" at the 2009 Australian Film Institute Awards.

In September 2008, George joined the cast of Grey's Anatomy for eleven episodes as Sadie Harris, a bisexual intern, but in January 2009 it was released that she was leaving the show in a mutual agreement with the producers. Also in 2008, she starred in the film The Betrayed, which was released at the San Diego Film Festival, and was released direct-to-video in the United States on 30 June 2009.

On 9 November 2009, it was announced that George would guest-star in at least two episodes of Fox's Lie to Me playing Clara Musso. George also received the lead role in the Australian-British mystery thriller by Chris Smith titled Triangle, which opened to positive reviews. George also starred in the British thriller film A Lonely Place to Die (2010), directed by Julian Gilbey. She climbed Ben Nevis mountain for her role in the film.

In November 2010, George was named the new face of L'Oréal Melbourne Fashion Festival. In 2012, George appeared as Rosie in the Australian TV series The Slap and as Sam Hunter in the British TV series Hunted, which was filmed over seven months in London, Scotland and Morocco. An American adaptation of the series, in which George again played the character Rosie, premièred on the NBC network in February 2015. A review of the U.S. series in The New York Times noted George's performance as "particularly beguiling ... As Rosie she is absurd, infuriating, sad and very funny."

In 2017, she was cast opposite Sean Penn in the television series The First (2018), created by Beau Willimon and filmed in New Orleans, Louisiana.

Other ventures
George is credited as the inventor of Style Snaps, a device intended to allow changing pant hem length without sewing. The product is marketed via direct response TV. She has stated that the invention earns her more money than her acting career.

Public image
In November 2012, while promoting the television series Hunted for The Sun-Herald television magazine in Australia, George was quoted as saying: "I don't need credibility from my country anymore, I just need them all to be quiet. If they have nothing intelligent to say, please don't speak to me anymore. I'd rather be having a croissant and a little espresso in Paris or walking my French bulldog in New York City." The response was purportedly spurred by George being tired of repeated questions about her role as Angel Parrish on Home and Awaythe role that had originally garnered her fame in Australiaas opposed to questions about her more recent projects. The publication of the article drew significant criticism, specifically from Australian publications. George would later say she was misquoted in the piece, and that the phrases had been "swapped around and put out of context": "I never said that at all. We were laughing and I never said anything negative about my country", she said.

In light of a publicised domestic violence dispute between George and her partner Jean-David Blanc in 2016, journalist Christine Sams, who had originally published the Sun-Herald article, wrote a public apology, in which she noted: "Many of those people attacking George have directly used those inane comments from my original interview (published years ago) to somehow justify her not receiving sympathy or help now. I just wanted to say sorry Melissa, you don't deserve it."

Personal life
In 1998, George met actor and film director Claudio Dabed in Bali. They married in 2000, and lived in Buenos Aires. In 2011, they announced their divorce.

In 2011, George met French entrepreneur Jean David Blanc (son of musician Serge Blanc), the founder of AlloCiné, at a BAFTA awards party. Together they have two sons, Raphaël (b. 2014) and Solal (b. 2015). In September 2016, George separated from Blanc following allegations of domestic abuse that purportedly occurred at their home in Paris. George was hospitalised with head and neck injuries, and both Blanc and George received domestic assault charges over the incident, with Blanc saying George instigated the confrontation. Blanc was ordered to pay George €1,000 in damages, and she €1 to him.

Shortly after the incident, George attempted to fly to the United States with the couple's two sons for a work arrangement, but was prevented from doing so by French authorities after Blanc alleged she was attempting to kidnap their children. George denied this, and said she had intended to return to France with the children after finishing the work engagement. In a 2017 interview on Sunday Night, George said she and Blanc had shared custody of the children, but that she felt trapped in France, unable to move freely between countries with her children; the custody arrangement made between the parties required that Blanc provide written consent before the couple's children were allowed to leave the country. She also alleged during the program that she believed Blanc had private detectives hired to follow her around Paris. Blanc denied George's allegations. In 2017, she stated she had resumed working in the United States, on the series The First, and flew between both countries to "spend the maximum time" with her children.

George became a naturalised American citizen in 2008.

Filmography

Film

Television

Awards and nominations

References

External links

 
 

20th-century American actresses
21st-century American actresses
Actresses from Perth, Western Australia
American child actresses
American film actresses
American soap opera actresses
American television actresses
American voice actresses
American video game actresses
Artistic roller skaters
Australian child actresses
Australian emigrants to the United States
Australian film actresses
Australian people of Scottish descent
Australian soap opera actresses
Australian voice actresses
Australian video game actresses
Living people
Logie Award winners
People with acquired American citizenship
Women inventors
Female roller skaters
Australian expatriate actresses in the United Kingdom
British child actresses
British film actresses
British soap opera actresses
British television actresses
British voice actresses
British video game actresses
Year of birth missing (living people)